Brianna Turner (born July 5, 1996) is an American professional basketball player for the Phoenix Mercury of the Women's National Basketball Association (WNBA) and for Virtus Bologna of the 
EuroCup Women. She played college women's basketball for the Notre Dame Fighting Irish women's basketball team at the University of Notre Dame in South Bend, Indiana. She is a native of Pearland, Texas.

She competed for the United States women's national basketball team at the 2012 FIBA Under-17 World Championship and the 2014 FIBA Americas Under-18 Championship.

College
Turner played college basketball at the University of Notre Dame in Notre Dame, Indiana for the Fighting Irish. Turner led Notre Dame to the 2017 NCAA Division I women's basketball tournament as a #1 seed after a 30–3 regular season record. During a game against Purdue in the second round of the tournament, Turner ruptured her ACL and was done for the season. She later announced that she would miss the 2017–18  season because of the same injury. She returned for her final season of eligibility in 2018–19 after receiving a hardship waiver from the NCAA.

Statistics 

|-
|2014–15
|Notre Dame
|36
|–
|25.5
|.651
|.000
|.605
|7.8
|0.6
|1.0
|2.4
|2.0
|13.7
|-
| style="text-align:left;"| 2015–16
| style="text-align:left;"| Notre Dame
|29
|–
|27.0
|.593 
|.000
|.639
|7.3
|0.9
|0.8
|3.0
|1.4
|14.5
|-
|2016–17
|Notre Dame
|35
|–
|28.6
|.619 
|.000
|.594
|7.1
|1.1
|0.8
|2.4
|1.8
|15.3
|-
|2017–18
|Notre Dame
|colspan="12"|Injured
|-
|2018–19
|Notre Dame
|39
|–
|27.8
|.631
|.000
|.701
|7.8
|1.5
|1.1
|2.7
|1.5
|14.3
|-
|Career
|
|139
|–
|27.3
|.624
|.000
|.636
|7.5
|1.1
|0.9
|2.6
|1.7
|14.5

Career

WNBA
At the 2019 WNBA draft, Turner was selected in the first round by the Atlanta Dream and was then quickly traded to the Phoenix Mercury. There Turner would join a line-up featuring players such as Diana Taurasi and Brittney Griner. In September 2019, Turner was named to the 2019 All-Rookie Team.

WNBL
In 2019, Turner was signed by the Adelaide Lightning in Australia's Women's National Basketball League (WNBL). There she would play alongside the likes of Crystal Langhorne, Stephanie Talbot and Laura Hodges.

Career statistics

WNBA

Regular season

|-
| align="left" | 2019
| align="left" | Phoenix
| 29 || 12 || 15.9 || .538 || .000 || .731 || 4.1 || 0.5 || 0.2 || 0.7 || 0.6 || 4.0
|-
| align="left" | 2020
| align="left" | Phoenix
| 22 || 22 || 27.9 || .579 || .000 || .643 || 9.0 || 1.8 || 1.1 || 2.0 || 1.4 || 7.2
|-
| align="left" | 2021
| align="left" | Phoenix
| 32 || 32 || 31.1 || .554 || .000 || .717 || 9.4 || 1.8 || 0.8 || 1.3 || 1.5 || 7.8
|-
| align="left" | 2022
| align="left" | Phoenix
| 35 || 35 || 33.4 || .607 || .000 || .500 || 6.8 || 2.3 || 1.2 || 1.6 || 1.4 || 4.3
|-
| align="left" | Career
| align="left" | 4 years, 1 team
| 118 || 101 || 27.4 || .568 || .000 || .653 || 7.3 || 1.6 || 0.8 || 1.4 || 1.2 || 5.7
|}

Postseason

|-
| align="left" | 2019
| align="left" | Phoenix
| 1 || 1 || 23.0 || .000 || .000 || .000 || 4.0 || 0.0 || 0.0 || 1.0 || 0.0 || 0.0
|-
| align="left" | 2020
| align="left" | Phoenix
| 2 || 2 || 39.5 || .800 || .000 || .250 || 12.5 || 4.0 || 1.0 || 2.0 || 2.5 || 8.5
|-
| align="left" | 2021
| align="left" | Phoenix
| 11 || 11 || 31.5 || .548 || .000 || .684 || 9.9 || 2.5 || 1.3 || 1.9 || 1.2 || 8.5
|-
| align="left" | 2022
| align="left" | Phoenix
| 2 || 2 || 30.0 || .444 || .000 || .000 || 11.5 || 2.5 || 0.0 || 0.5 || 1.0 || 4.0
|-
| align="left" | Career
| align="left" | 4 years, 1 team
| 16 || 16 || 31.8 || .553 || .000 || .609 || 10.1 || 2.6 || 1.0 || 1.7 || 1.3 || 7.4
|}

References

External links
Notre Dame Fighting Irish bio

1996 births
Living people
All-American college women's basketball players
American women's basketball players
Atlanta Dream draft picks
Basketball players from Texas
McDonald's High School All-Americans
Notre Dame Fighting Irish women's basketball players
Parade High School All-Americans (girls' basketball)
People from Pearland, Texas
Phoenix Mercury players
Power forwards (basketball)
Sportspeople from Harris County, Texas